This is a list of people from Clay County, Kansas.  Inclusion on the list should be reserved for notable people past and present who have resided in the county, either in cities or rural areas.

Academics
 Tenney Frank, scholar and historian

Arts and entertainment
 Steve Doocy, host for Fox News' Fox & Friends
 William Penhallow Henderson, artist and architect
 Robert McAlmon, poet and author
 Robert E. Pearson, filmmaker and painter

Athletes
 Herb Bradley, professional baseball player
 Bob Cain, pro baseball player
 Tracy Claeys, college football coach
 Brady Cowell, college basketball and football coach
 Eldon Danenhauer, offensive tackle for the Denver Broncos
 Nicole Ohlde, professional basketball player
 Ken Swenson, middle distance runner in 1972 Summer Olympics
 Waldo S. Tippin, college basketball and football coach
 Dave Wiemers, college football coach

Medicine
 Warren Henry Cole, surgeon who pioneered X-ray use in medicine

Politicians
 William Avery, Governor of Kansas from 1965 to 1967
 George Docking, former governor of Kansas
 Orchid I. Jordan, Missouri state legislator
 William D. Vincent, United States Representative

See also

 Lists of people from Kansas

References

Clay County